Samnangjin Station is a railway station on the Gyeongbu Line and the Gyeongjeon Line.

References

External links
 Cyber station information from Korail

Railway stations in South Gyeongsang Province
Miryang
Railway stations in Korea  opened in 1905